KMVP-FM (98.7 MHz) is a commercial radio station in Phoenix, Arizona, featuring a sports format branded as "98.7 FM Arizona's Sports Station". Local programming airs on weekdays from 6 a.m. to 8 p.m. and Saturdays from 7 a.m. to 2 p.m., with ESPN Sports Radio heard nights and weekends. Owned by Salt Lake City–based Bonneville International, KMVP-FM's radio studios are on North 16th Street in Phoenix near Piestewa Peak, while the transmitter is in South Mountain Park.

Arizona Sports is the flagship station of the MLB's Arizona Diamondbacks, NBA's Phoenix Suns, the NFL's Arizona Cardinals and the Arizona State University Sun Devils football games.

History

KTAR-FM and KBBC
In July 1960, the station signed on as KTAR-FM, co-owned with KTAR and KTAR-TV (now KPNX). KTAR-AM-FM mostly simulcast a middle of the road format of popular music, news and sports. In 1973, the FM station became KBBC, to distinguish it from sister station KTAR.

KBBC aired a beautiful music format of mostly instrumental cover versions of popular adult songs, along with some Broadway and Hollywood show tunes. Over time, to stay youthful, KBBC added more soft vocals and reduced the instrumentals.

KKLT (98.7 K-Lite)
The station became one of the nation's pioneers in a format that became known as "Soft Rock" under the programming direction of J.D. Freeman who moved over from KNIX-FM afternoon drive. In 1982, the format evolved into a soft adult contemporary music format branded as "K-Lite."

To go along with the K-Lite branding, the call sign was changed to KKLT. The staff included program director Marc McCoy and sales manager Ken Hoag. KKLT had to compete with KESZ for the Soft AC audience. As it lost ratings to its rival, KKLT gradually stepped up the tempo of its music to a more mainstream AC direction. Despite the changes, KESZ continued to dominate in audience share.

KPKX (98.7 The Peak)
On May 28, 2004, the format was changed to adult hits as "The Peak." The call letters were switched to KPKX on May 9, 2005. KPKX became one of the first stations in the U.S. to flip to the format, and the first not to do it as "Jack FM" or "Bob FM". The first song on "The Peak" was "A Change Would Do You Good" by Sheryl Crow.

The Peak featured the voice of actor John O'Hurley as "Mr. Peakerman", a well meaning but bumbling station owner who more or less allows the staff to play "Whatever they want". The station was the brainchild of programmer Joel Grey, with writing and creative imaging produced by John Hugill. Highly successful for Bonneville, it became the de facto flagship of other properties like 95.7 Max FM in San Francisco and 106.5 The Arch in St. Louis.

KMVP-FM (Arizona Sports 98.7)
At 10 a.m. on January 6, 2014, KPKX played its final song, All The Small Things by Blink-182, followed by a brief goodbye message from content manager Steve Douglas. At that point, KPKX flipped to a simulcast of sports radio-formatted KTAR. On January 9, 2014, KPKX changed its call sign to KMVP-FM; there was already a KTAR-FM on air, and as such 98.7 was unable to simply copy the AM callsign.

On July 10, 2014, Bonneville announced Arizona Sports will be exclusively heard on 98.7 FM, effective September 15. KTAR then began carrying ESPN Radio full time.

Programming
Dan Bickley and Vince Marotta host the morning drive time. Luke Lapinski and Ron Wolfley are heard in middays. Dave Burns and John Gambadoro are on in the afternoon. ESPN Radio is carried late nights and weekends.

References

External links

MVP-FM
Radio stations established in 1960
1960 establishments in Arizona
Bonneville International
ESPN Radio stations